Tyler Coppin (born 9 November 1956) is an American-Australian actor, playwright and American dialect coach for actors in film, television and theatre.

Personal life and education
Coppin is a fourth-generation Californian born in Roseville, California, the second child of Ronald and Gayle (Terry) Coppin. He was raised in the Sacramento suburbs of Rancho Cordova and Carmichael, California. The Coppin family are also long-term residents of Stinson Beach, California. Coppin attended Rio Americano High School and California State University, Sacramento before migrating to Australia aged 19, where he attended and graduated from the National Institute of Dramatic Art. He now divides his time between the United States and Australia after residing in Sydney for many years working in theatre, film and television. In 2001 Coppin moved to Melbourne with Jane Borghesi where the couple married in 2006. They have one son.

He became an Australian citizen in 1993.

Career
His many stage appearances include The Child Catcher in the Australian national production of Chitty Chitty Bang Bang, Mr Mushnik in the 2016 Australian national tour of Little Shop of Horrors, Robert Helpmann in his one-man play Lyrebird: Tales of Helpmann and Puck in the acclaimed Opera Australia production of Benjamin Britten's A Midsummer Night's Dream directed by Baz Luhrmann with set and costumes by Catherine Martin. In 1989, at the request of playwright Patrick White he played the role of the Young Man in the Sydney Theatre Company production of The Ham Funeral, directed by Neil Armfield.

His television appearances include Nightmares and Dreamscapes: From the Stories of Stephen King and Neighbours.

His film appearances include Hacksaw Ridge directed by Mel Gibson, The Spierig Brothers' Winchester and Predestination starring Ethan Hawke, The Death and Life of Otto Bloom, The Tender Hook, Emulsion, One Night Stand, Lorca and the Outlaws and Mad Max 2.

Coppin has appeared in the Melbourne Theatre Company's production of Born Yesterday, His Girl Friday, Ruby Moon, A Behanding in Spokane by playwright Martin McDonagh, and as Vice Principal Panch in The 25th Annual Putnam County Spelling Bee, for which he wrote additional material. He also narrated several audiobooks, including an adaptation of the American children's TV series Bear in the Big Blue House, released by ABC For Kids.

Filmography

Film

Playwright and writer
 Lyrebird: Tales of Helpmann - Sydney Opera House, Edinburgh Festival Fringe, City of London Festival, Australia, New Zealand, United States;
 Buzz - co-written with Warren Coleman, Belvoir (theatre); 
 The Minutiae of Inertia - Melbourne Fringe Festival 2005;
 UnAmerica
 Happy Feet - contributing writer
Strictly Ballroom - play, contributing writer.

Awards
 Edinburgh Fringe First Award for Lyrebird: Tales of Helpmann
 Helpmann Awards, Best Supporting Actor for The 25th Annual Putnam County Spelling Bee
 Green Room Awards, Best Supporting Actor for Chitty Chitty Bang Bang

References

External links

Interview with Tyler Coppin about solo show "The Minutiae of Inertia"

Living people
1956 births
Australian male film actors
Australian male television actors
Australian male stage actors
American emigrants to Australia
Naturalised citizens of Australia
Helpmann Award winners
National Institute of Dramatic Art alumni
Voice coaches
People from Roseville, California
People from Rancho Cordova, California
People from Carmichael, California
People from Stinson Beach, California